Randall "Randy" Head (born November 18, 1968) was a Republican member of the Indiana Senate, representing the 18th District since 2008. He used to be Deputy Prosecutor for Cass County. He resigned from the State Senate on August 12, 2019, to become Chief Deputy Prosecutor of Pulaski County. He was replaced by Stacey Donato.

References

External links
Virtual Office of Senator Randy Head official Indiana State Legislature site
 

1968 births
Living people
21st-century American politicians
Republican Party Indiana state senators
Indiana University Maurer School of Law alumni
Wabash College alumni